The Frauenthal House is a historic house in Conway, Arkansas.  It was designed by Charles L. Thompson and built in 1913, exhibiting a combination of Colonial Revival, Georgian Revival, and Craftsman styling.  It is a two-story brick building, topped by a gabled tile roof with exposed rafter ends in the eaves.  A Classical portico shelters the entrance, with four Tuscan columns supporting an entablature and full pedimented and dentillated gable.  The  house, with 22 rooms, was built for Jo and Ida Baridon Frauenthal and is currently occupied by the Conway Regional Health Foundation.

The house was listed on the U.S. National Register of Historic Places in 1982.

See also
Frauenthal & Schwarz Building, Conway, Arkansas, also associated with Charles L. Thompson and related firms and NRHP-listed
Frauenthal House (Little Rock, Arkansas), also Charles L. Thompson-designed and NRHP-listed

References

Houses on the National Register of Historic Places in Arkansas
Colonial Revival architecture in Arkansas
Georgian Revival architecture in Arkansas
Houses completed in 1913
Houses in Conway, Arkansas
1913 establishments in Arkansas
National Register of Historic Places in Faulkner County, Arkansas